The 2004 Halton Borough Council election took place on 10 June 2004 to elect members of Halton Unitary Council in Cheshire, England. The whole council was up for election with boundary changes since the last election in 2002. The Labour Party stayed in overall control of the council.

Campaign
All 56 seats were being contested after boundary changes had taken place, with 119 candidates competing for election. Labour contested all 56 seats, compared to 32 for the Conservatives, 19 Liberal Democrats, 3 Green Party, 2 British National Party, 1 Legalise Cannabis Alliance and 1 independent. There were also 4 candidates from the new Citizens Party of Halton, with 3 of them being former Labour councillors. The election in Halton, along with the rest of North West England, was held with all postal voting as part of an attempt to increase turnout.

Before the election Labour dominated the council with 47 of the 56 seats. As a result, the Liberal Democrats and Conservatives were aiming just to reduced Labour's majority to provide a better opposition, with the Conservatives standing in every ward.

A major issue in the election was the attempt by the council to secure funding for a second crossing over the River Mersey. The Labour party defended their record in control of the council, pointing to the regeneration of the town centres of Widnes and Runcorn and improvements in services.

Results
The results saw both the Liberal Democrats and Conservatives make significant gains against Labour, but with Labour keeping a safe majority on the council. The Liberal Democrats made gains in Halton Brook, Norton North and Windmill Hill wards, while the Conservatives picked up seats in Birchfield and Farnworth wards. Windmill Hill required 2 recounts before the Liberal Democrat, Kelly Marlow, was declared the winner by a single vote over the Labour candidate. Labour councillors who failed to be re-elected included the deputy mayor, Dennis Middlemass, who lost in Mersey ward to the Liberal Democrats after 12 years on the council. Overall turnout in the election was 38%, almost double what was seen at the last election in 2002.

Labour's leader of the council, Tony McDermott, blamed national policies and mid term votes against the government for the losses, but was pleased at preserving a good majority which he said demonstrated "a welcome level of support".

Ward results

References

2004 English local elections
2004
2000s in Cheshire